Uluyelga (Oloyılğa) is a rural locality (a selo) in Ishlinsky Selsoviet, Beloretsky District, Bashkortostan, Russia. The population was 453 as of 2010. There are 5 streets.

Geography 
Uluyelga is located 39 km west of Beloretsk (the district's administrative centre) by road. Karagay-Yurt is the nearest rural locality.

References 

Rural localities in Beloretsky District